The 2008 Mississippi State Bulldogs football team represented Mississippi State University during the 2008 NCAA Division I FBS football season. The team's head coach was Sylvester Croom. The Bulldogs played their six home games in 2008 at Davis Wade Stadium at Scott Field in Starkville, Mississippi and finished with a 4–8 overall record.

Croom resigned at the end of the season and on December 10, Mississippi State hired Florida offensive coordinator Dan Mullen.

Schedule

Rankings indicate opponent's position in AP Poll as released week prior to game. Schedule Source:

Game summaries

Louisiana Tech

Last Meeting: September 21, 1996, L 23–38Series Record: MSU leads 7–2

Southeastern Louisiana

Last Meeting: Never MetSeries Record: Never Met

Auburn

Last Meeting: September 15, 2007, W 19–14Series Record: MSU trails 23–56–2

Georgia Tech

Last Meeting: October 5, 1929, L 13–27Series Record: MSU trails 0–2

LSU

Last Meeting: August 30, 2007, L 0–45Series Record: MSU trails 33–65–3

Vanderbilt

Last Meeting: October 2, 2004, L 13–31Series Record: MSU leads 10–7–2

Tennessee

Last Meeting: October 13, 2007, L 21–33Series Record: MSU trails 15–27–1

Middle Tennessee

Last Meeting:October 28, 2000,W 61–35Series Record: MSU leads 2–0

Kentucky

Last Meeting: October 27, 2007, W 31–14Series Record: MSU trails 15–20

Alabama

Last Meeting: November 10, 2007, W 17–12Series Record: MSU trails 18–71–3

Arkansas

Last Meeting: November 17, 2007, L 31–45Series Record: MSU trails 5–12–1

Ole Miss

Last Meeting: November 23, 2007, W 17–14Series Record: MSU trails 39–59–6

Statistics
Mississippi State Overall Team Statistics (as of Oct 11, 2008)

Team

Scores by quarter

Offense

Rushing

Passing

Receiving

Defense

Special teams

Coaching staff

References

Mississippi State
Mississippi State Bulldogs football seasons
Mississippi State Bulldogs football